The Z7/8 Beijing-Qingdao Through Train (Chinese:Z7/8次北京到青岛北直达特快列车) is Chinese railway running between the capital Beijing to Qingdao express passenger trains by the Beijing Railway Bureau, Qingdao passenger segment responsible for passenger transport task, Qingdao originating on the Beijing train. 25T Type Passenger trains running along the Jiaoji Railway and Jinghu Railway across Shandong, Hebei, Tianjin, Beijing and other provinces and cities, the entire 873 km. Beijing railway station to Qingdao North railway station running 8 hours and 41 minutes, use trips for Z7; Qingdao North railway station to Beijing railway station to run 9 hours and 19 minutes, use trips for Z8.

Carriages

Locomotives

Timetable

See also 
Beijing-Qingdao Through Train

References

External links 
青岛至北京增开直达特快列车 可在火车上过夜

Passenger rail transport in China
Rail transport in Beijing
Rail transport in Shandong